Bairdiella is a genus of fish in the family Sciaenidae.

Species
There are currently six recognized species in this genus:
Bairdiella armata Gill, 1863 – armed croaker
Bairdiella chrysoura (Lacépède, 1802) – silver perch
Bairdiella ensifera (Jordan & Gilbert, 1882) – swordspine croaker
Bairdiella icistia (Jordan & Gilbert, 1882) – ronco croaker
Bairdiella ronchus (Cuvier, 1830) – ground croaker
Bairdiella sanctaeluciae (Jordan, 1890)

References

Sciaenidae